In econometrics, the Park test is a test for heteroscedasticity. The test is based on the method proposed by Rolla Edward Park for estimating linear regression parameters in the presence of heteroscedastic error terms.

Background

In regression analysis, heteroscedasticity refers to unequal variances of the random error terms , such that

.

It is assumed that . Equivalently, heteroscedasticity refers to unequal conditional variances in the response variables , such that

,

again a value that depends on  – or, more specifically, a value that is conditional on the values of one or more of the regressors .  Homoscedasticity, one of the basic Gauss–Markov assumptions of ordinary least squares linear regression modeling, refers to equal variance in the random error terms regardless of the trial or observation, such that

, a constant.

Test description

Park, on noting a standard recommendation of assuming proportionality between error term variance and the square of the regressor, suggested instead that analysts 'assume a structure for the variance of the error term' and suggested one such structure:

 

in which the error terms  are considered well behaved.

This relationship is used as the basis for this test.

The modeler first runs the unadjusted regression

The squared residuals  in turn estimate .

We reject the null hypothesis of homoscedasticity and conclude that heteroscedasticity is present.

Notes

The test has been discussed in econometrics textbooks. Stephen Goldfeld and Richard E. Quandt raise concerns about the assumed structure, cautioning that the vi may be heteroscedastic and otherwise violate assumptions of ordinary least squares regression.

See also
White test
Glejser test

Notes

Statistical tests
Regression diagnostics